Kareela was a "K-class" ferry on Sydney Harbour. Launched in 1905, the double-ended timber-hulled steamer was built for Sydney Ferries Limited in response to the early twentieth century boom in cross-harbour ferry travel prior to the opening of the Sydney Harbour Bridge. She was the first of Sydney Ferries Limited's boats to have a fully enclosed upper deck.

She survived the 1932 opening of the Sydney Harbour Bridge when many ferries were removed from service, and also the early 1950s rationalisation of the fleet following NSW Government takeover. Nicknamed "The Box", she had a relatively incident free career apart from a collision with a wharf that killed three of her passengers. She was sold in 1959 and broken up.

"Kareela" is thought to be an Australian Aboriginal word meaning "south wind".

Background
Kareela was built for Sydney Ferries Limited during the early twentieth century boom in cross-Harbour travel prior to the 1932 opening of the Sydney Harbour Bridge. At the time, the company ran one of the largest ferry fleets in the world. A population boom in the suburbs of Neutral Bay, Cremorne, and Mosman saw them served by an increasing number of ferries. The ferry was part of a broader type of around 20 double-ended timber screw ferries the Sydney K-class ferries that the company commissioned between the 1890s and early 1920s to meet the booming demand.

Kareela followed the Sydney Ferries Limited tradition of naming their vessels after Australian Aboriginal words starting with "K". "Kareela" is thought to mean "south wind".

Design and construction

Built in 1905, Kareela's hull, cabins and deck fittings were by Morrison & Sinclair Ltd, of Balmain. Her hull was flamed right out with no overhanging sponsons. The sponsons were made of 14 x 10 inch iron bark girders, and the vessel was double framed of hard wood making it one of the harbour's strongest ferries at the time. The hull of the ferry was designed by Scolt, s foreman shipwright of the North Coast Steam Navigation Co, from a specification by T Brown, the Sydney Ferries Ltd works manager. The cabins and other deck fittings were designed by the companies' officials, under the supervision of T Brown. She had one iron bulkhead and four of wood. She was built with lodging knees around the inside of the hull and 24 hanging knees. The keel consisted of three lengths of iron bark, the longest being 50 feet. There were 20 iron stanchions in the engine and boiler rooms. Under the deck over the boilers were galvanised iron sheets minimise fire risk.

She was 186 tons, 34.4 m in length, and had a passenger capacity of 784.

Kareela was the first of Sydney Ferries Limited to have upper decks fully enclosed. The earlier K-class vessels, including Kurraba, Kirribilli, Koree and Kulgoa had only the sides of their upper decks enclosed leaving the ends open, with the roofs being squared off. On Kareela and all subsequent K-class vessels had an upper deck structure with curving roof lines that met at the rear of the wheelhouses thus the upper deck saloon was fully enclosed. Kareela had four companionways, two on each side, leading to the upper deck.

Her boilers 40 hp triple expansion steam engine was supplied by Chapman & Co Ltd and pushed her to 10 knots. The compound surface condensing engines had cylinders 14 inches x 27 inches in diameter, with a stroke of 18 inches. The electrics, including 83 16-cp incandescent light fittings, were provided by Scott, Henderson and Co. Her two steering wheels were made from teak taken from the former .

Service history
Kareela was launched on 31 May 1905. Among those present were Mr Russell (Chairman of directors), W G Todd (secretary Sydney Ferries, Limited), and Mr Sinclair (of Morrison and Sinclair). The vessel was christened by Miss Enid Russell (thought to be the chairman's daughter), who broke a bottle of champagne on the propeller of the vessel. Her trials were on 7 September 1905 and she entered service 4 days later initially on the Neutral Bay run. Kareela earned the nickname "The Box", which may have been due to appearing to not float any lower in the water no matter how many passengers she was carrying.

In 1932, the Sydney Harbour Bridge was opened, and Sydney Ferries Ltd's annual patronage dropped from 40 million to about 15 million. Almost 20 Sydney Ferry Limited boats were put up for sale, however, Kareela was one of the boats kept on. The post-Bridge drop in demand for the ferry fleet was somewhat mitigated as many could not afford their own transport in the Great Depression of the 1930s and rationing of fuel during World War 2 made the coal required for the steam ferries relatively cheap.

However, the post World War II years saw the drop in demand pick up pace. In 1951, with annual patronage down to 9 million, the NSW State Government took over Sydney Ferries Limited and its remaining fleet and assets. The Port Jackson and Manly Steamship Company, which ran the Manly service, was paid to run the services. The services and fleet were quickly rationalised with most of the larger remaining timber K-class steamers being decommissioned. Kirrule, Kiandra, Kamiri and Kirawa were all broken up at this time. Kareela, however, was again retained in service. The reprieve was short-lived and in 1959, she was sold for breaking up after Kosciusko returned to service following her conversion to diesel power.

Incidents

The worst incident in Kareela's career was on 28 August 1924, when she crashed into the P&O wharf on Bennelong Point having just left Circular Quay for Taronga Zoo. A three week old baby, his mother and grandmother died. The three, and other injured family members, had been sitting outside at the front of the ferry. The ferry hit with such force that the wharf deck sliced deep into the ferry under the roof of its main deck. The steering pole was smashed, much of the bulwarks ripped out, a lifeboat thrown onto the wharf and much of the cabin's walls and windows were destroyed. The front part of the ferry's upper deck collapsed as it was later towed from the wharf. Her hull, however, remained intact. The wharf also suffered significant damage with decking smashed and four piles broken. Damage to the ferry was estimated at £600 while damage to the wharf was around £200. A jammed steering gear was found to be the cause, and the master's ticket was suspended for two year's for not testing the wheel at departure.

Over the rest of her career, Kareela had other incidents, but none as serious as the fatal 1924 collision: 
 On 29 January 1911, Kareela collided with Balmain New Ferry Company steamer Lady Carrington near Bradleys Head. Neither ferry was carrying passengers. Much of Lady Carrington's starboard bulwark was torn away, however, Kareela suffered little damage. 
 In 1914, she collided with a then new Barrenjoey. 
 On 26 May 1921, she collided with Manly ferry Balgowlah.
 On 9 January 1924, whilst leaving Sydney Cove on a trip to Taronga Zoo, Kareela collided with Manly ferry Barrenjoey, which was entering the Cove to berth at Circular Quay. The smaller timber Kareela suffered significant damage to her port bow, while the larger steel Barrenjoey had damage to her sponson.
 Returning to Circular Quay with a weekend load of passengers from Taronga Zoo on 15 March 1930, she failed to stop and hit the retaining wall, shattering both her bow timbers and the Quay pavement. 
 On 28 October 1932, Kareela collided with the oil lighter, Voco, whilst traveling from Waterview Bay to McMahons Point to coal. The Voco sustained light damaged, however, 5 drums of oil were swept from the Voco, only four of which were recovered.
 On 2 August 1937, she ran into piles at Circular Quay damaging her superstructure.

See also
 List of Sydney Harbour ferries
 Timeline of Sydney Harbour ferries

Notes

References

External links

Ferries of New South Wales
Ferry transport in Sydney
1905 ships
Sydney Harbour
Water transport in New South Wales
Ships of Australia
Sydney K-class ferries